Henry Harris may refer to:

Arts and entertainment
Henry Harris (actor) (1634–1704), English actor and theatre manager
Henry B. Harris (1866–1912), Broadway producer and theatre owner
Henry Harris (cinematographer) (1899–1971), British cinematographer

Politics
Henry R. Harris (1828–1909), U.S. Representative from Georgia
Henry S. Harris (1850–1902), United States Representative from New Jersey
Sir Henry Percy Harris (1856–1941), British Conservative Member of Parliament for Paddington South, 1910–1922

Sports
Henry Harris (English cricketer) (1854–1923), English cricketer
Henry Harris (Australian cricketer) (1865–1933), Australian cricketer
Henry Harris (ice hockey) (1905–1975), Canadian ice hockey player
Henry Harris (baseball), Negro league baseball player
Henry Harris (American football) (born c. 1965), American college football player

Other
Henry Harris (anatomist) (1885–1968), Professor of Anatomy at Cambridge University
Henry Ellis Harris (1902–1977), American stamp dealer
Sir Henry Harris (scientist) (1925–2014), Australian pioneer in oncology and human genetics 
Henry Silton Harris (1926–2007), British-Canadian philosopher

See also
Harry Harris (disambiguation)